Boloria kriemhild, the relict fritillary, is a species of fritillary in the family Nymphalidae. It is found in North America.

The MONA or Hodges number for Boloria kriemhild is 4468.

References

Further reading

 
 
 
 
 
 
 
 
 
 
 

Boloria
Butterflies described in 1879